The Lafayette Hardware Store is a historic commercial building located at 121 West Vermilion Street in Lafayette, Louisiana.

Built in c.1890, is a two-story frame building with a false front in Italianate style. The ground story originally hosted two separate stores until c.1915 when a dividing wall was removed. The store is one of Lafayette oldest commercial buildings.

The building was listed on the National Register of Historic Places on June 14, 1984.

See also
 National Register of Historic Places listings in Lafayette Parish, Louisiana

References

Commercial buildings on the National Register of Historic Places in Louisiana
Italianate architecture in Louisiana
Commercial buildings completed in 1890
Lafayette Parish, Louisiana
National Register of Historic Places in Lafayette Parish, Louisiana